"Tell the World" is a 1994 song by Swedish singer Pandora. It was released in October 1994 as the lead single from her second studio album, Tell the World (1995). The single features an uncredited rap by M-Fuse and became Pandora's third top-5 single in Sweden, peaking at number 5 on the Swedish charts.

Critical reception
Music & Media wrote in their review, "Tell the world another talented Swedish singer has just stood up to be counted. The reggae set-up has Ace of Base cleverness, while the singing is ABBA-esque and the rapper is the finishing Euro touch." Manila Standard commented that "you are swept by the dizzying beat" of the song.

Track listing
CD Single
 "Tell the World" (Radio Edit) - 3:37
 "Tell the World"  (Extended Club Mix) - 5:29

CD Maxi
 "Tell the World" (Radio Edit) - 3:37
 "Tell the World" (Extended Club Mix) - 5:29
 "Tell the World" (Straight Outta Kalahari) - 3:37

Chart performance

Weekly charts

Year-end charts

United DJ's vs. Pandora remix

"Tell the World" was re-released in July 2007 as the third single from United DJs vs. Pandora's album, Celebration (2007).  

The song peaked at number 7 on the Swedish Singles Chart.

Track listing
Swedish and Finnish CD single (2007)
 "Tell the World" (Radio Edit) - 3:09
 "Tell the World" (Groove Maniax Casablanca Edit) - 3:17
 "Tell the World" (Groove Maniax Casablanca Extended) - 4:12
 "Tell the World" (Team Dicaster Funky-String Edit) - 3:23

Charts

References

1994 songs
1994 singles
2007 singles
English-language Swedish songs
Virgin Records singles
Pandora (singer) songs